Izatha metadelta is a moth of the family Oecophoridae. It is endemic to New Zealand, where it is known from the North Island only. It is rare north of Waikato and the Bay of Plenty.

Taxonomy 
This species was first described by Edward Meyrick in 1905 using three specimens collected in Wellington by George Hudson. The lectotype specimen is held at the Natural History Museum, London. Hudson discussed and illustrated this species in his 1928 publication The Butterflies and Moths of New Zealand.

Description

The wingspan is 15–18.5 mm for males and 19–25.5 mm for females. Meyrick first described this species as follows: 

Adults have been recorded in December, January and February.

Larvae have been reared from the under bark of dead Aristotelia serrata, from a rather dry, soft fallen branch of Hedycarya arborea and from unspecified damp, rotten wood on the ground.

References

External links
 Image of Izatha metadelta

Oecophorinae
Endemic fauna of New Zealand
Moths of New Zealand
Taxa named by Edward Meyrick
Endemic moths of New Zealand